Burkholderia vietnamiensis is a species of bacteria. It can be found as an opportunistic pathogen in patients with cystic fibrosis or other immunocompromising illnesses. It differs from most Burkholderia species in that it is often susceptible to aminoglycosides, but not polymyxin B. Many isolates have been found to be catalase positive. B. vietnamiensis is able to fix  (nitrogen fixation).

References

External links

Type strain of Burkholderia vietnamiensis at BacDive -  the Bacterial Diversity Metadatabase

Burkholderiaceae
Bacteria described in 1995